Bill Rennells (born 25 July 1931) is an English broadcaster and former journalist, who currently presents Harmony Night on BBC Radio Oxford. Rennells previously hosted the late night programme Nightride on BBC Radio 2 for 14 years.

Born in Canterbury, Rennells spent 25 years working as a journalist for various newspapers throughout the south of England, these included the Kentish Gazette, Eastbourne Gazette and Oxford Mail. In 1970 he joined the newly formed BBC Radio Oxford as a news producer and then became a freelance presenter on Radio Nottingham.

In November 1978 Rennells joined the national broadcaster BBC Radio 2 as presenter of the Thursday edition of the graveyard slot, he also co-hosted the Monday night programme Music from the Movies. In 1980 he began presenting both the Sunday and Thursday graveyard programmes. In February 1984 he took over the early morning programme and occasionally deputised for Ray Moore on the early breakfast show. In November 1984 he began presenting the late night programme Nightride, which he presented until June 1993. He left Radio 2 soon after, however he did continue to present specialist programmes for the station until 1995.

Rennells became one of the founding presenters of Saga Radio in 2004, where he presented a mid morning programme. In 2011 he returned to Radio Oxford, where he has been since. He currently presents the Sunday late night programme Harmony Night which also is broadcast on Radio Kent and Berkshire.

References

External links
 Presenter Profile: Bill Rennells
 BBC Local Radio Harmony Night

1931 births
Living people
People from Canterbury
English radio presenters
BBC Radio 2 presenters
English male journalists
British radio journalists
Classical music radio presenters